Peterson Zah (December 2, 1937 – March 7, 2023) was an American politician who held several offices with the Navajo Nation. From 1983 to 1987, he was chairman of the Navajo Nation, its then head of government. At its 1991 restructuring, he became the first president of the Navajo Nation, until 1995. He then worked at Arizona State University as special adviser to the president on American Indian Affairs and consulted companies willing to work with his nation.

Biography

Peterson Zah was born December 2, 1937, in Low Mountain, Arizona, the son of Henry and Mae Multine Zah. He was educated at Phoenix Indian School and Arizona State University, where he received a bachelor's degree in education in 1963.

After college, Zah spent a year working in Phoenix for the Arizona Vocational Education Department, teaching carpentry to adult students seeking vocational skills. From 1965 to 1967, he was a participant in Volunteers in Service to America, working at Arizona State University as field coordinator of a training center.

In 1967, Zah became deputy director of the Diné beʼiiná Náhiilnaah bee Aghaʼdiitʼaahii People's Legal Service, a nonprofit organization. A few years later, he became executive director and remained so until 1981. Under his leadership, several of the organization's legal cases related to Indian sovereignty reached the U.S. Supreme Court.

In 1972, Zah won election to the school board in Window Rock, Arizona; the following year he became board president. In 1983 he became chairman of the Navajo Tribal Council at Window Rock, the governing body for the Navajo reservation headquartered there. He served in that position until 1987, when he began fundraising for the Navajo Education and Scholarship Foundation. In 1989 and 1990 he directed a regional office for Save the Children, and in 1990 was elected the first president of the Navajo Nation. He was inaugurated as president on January 15, 1991.

During his time as Navajo president, Zah worked with Hopi tribal leader and childhood friend Ivan Sidney to resolve issues related to the land dispute between the two tribes. This did not help the Navajo Hopi Joint Use Area situation, and thousands of Navajo were relocated. During Zah's term, he established the Navajo Nation Permanent Trust Fund (NNPTF), utilizing tens of millions of dollars won in a lawsuit against Peabody Coal Company. , the NNPTF had grown to over US$3.2 billion.

In 1995, Zah became special advisor to the president on American Indian Affairs for Arizona State University. Zah received honorary degrees from Colorado College and the College of Santa Fe.

Zah died of cancer on March 7, 2023, at Fort Defiance Hospital in Fort Defiance, Arizona, at age 85.

References

1937 births
2023 deaths
Arizona State University alumni
Arizona State University faculty
School board members in Arizona
Presidents of the Navajo Nation
People from Navajo County, Arizona
People from Window Rock, Arizona
20th-century Native Americans
21st-century Native Americans
Native American people from Arizona